Tony Gardner (born 10 January 1964) is an English actor and doctor. He sits on the national governing body of the actors' trade union Equity.

Career
Gardner qualified as a physician at Guy's Hospital in 1987, then as a general practitioner in 1993. He combined medicine and comedy during the 1990s as half of the award-winning comedy duo Struck Off and Die with Phil Hammond.

Acting career
Gardner eventually left medicine to become an actor, starring in a number of TV commercials, including that for the Renault Mégane. He reached prominence playing Brian Johnson in CITV's My Parents Are Aliens (episodes of which he also wrote) and Michael, the café owner in Jack Dee's BBC sitcom Lead Balloon. In 2009–10 he starred in three plays directed by Sir Peter Hall. In 2011 he played Professor Tony Shales in the Channel 4 series Fresh Meat.

Between 2012 and 2020, he played John in five series of the critically acclaimed romantic drama series Last Tango in Halifax. The programme attracted impressive ratings for BBC One, with the third series posting an average of 7.8 million viewers.

Between 2013 and 2015, he appeared as Lieutenant Colonel Phillip Smith in three series of the wartime comedy Bluestone 42, about a British bomb disposal detachment in Afghanistan during Operation Herrick. He appeared as Dan Miller MP in the BBC political comedy The Thick of It. He was a main character of the music video "Giant Peach" by Wolf Alice. He appeared in a variety of roles in Tracey Ullman's Show from 2016. He also appeared in an episode of the Netflix show, Lovesick, portraying Dylan’s father at surprise wedding anniversary party.

In January 2021, Gardner appeared in S11E1 of Not Going Out as a neighbour to Lee and Lucy. He then appeared again in S12E4 in 2022.

Filmography

References

External links

Profile

English male film actors
English male television actors
Living people
1964 births
20th-century English medical doctors
People from Ashton-under-Lyne
Male actors from Lancashire
Alumni of King's College London
British general practitioners